Negro World, also known as the Weekly Negro World, was an African American newspaper published in Knoxville, Tennessee in 1887.
It was published by Patterson, Elms & Co. During a two-week period it was issued daily as an advertising medium.

Irvine Garland Penn was a correspondent for the paper.

See also
List of African-American newspapers in Tennessee

References

Defunct newspapers published in Tennessee
Defunct African-American newspapers
1887 establishments in Tennessee
African Americans in Tennessee